, son of regent Nijō Michihira, was a Japanese kugyō (court noble), waka poet, and renga master of the early Nanboku-chō period (1336–1392).

Yoshimoto's wife gave birth to Nijō Moroyoshi. With another woman, he had sons Nijō Morotsugu and Ichijō Tsunetsugu.

Career as government official
Yoshimoto held the regent position of kampaku three times (from 1346 to 1347, from 1363 to 1367, and in 1388), and that of sesshō twice (from 1382 to 1388, and in 1388).

 1381 (Eitoku 1, 7th month): Yoshimoto is made Daijō Daijin.
 1387 (Kakei 1, 1st month): Yoshimoto is deprived of his position as daijō daijin.
 1388 (Kakei 2, 6th month): Yoshitomo dies at age 69; and his son Nijō Morotsugu succeeds him with the title of kampaku.

Scholar-poet
Yoshimoto learned waka from Ton'a and renga from Gusai and Kyūsei. He regarded himself primarily as a waka poet; he authored several treatises on the subject.  It is for renga that he is best known. By the age of thirty, he was regarded as an authority on the subject. He authored a number of books including:
, a text on renga poetics
, the first edited collection of renga
, general discourse on renga in question-answer style
, a discussion of renga style; co-authored with Ton'a
, a text on renga rules
, a treatise on waka poetics

Historian
The author  of Masukagami is unknown, but it is believed that Nijō Yoshimoto had a hand in its writing.  The book is a Japanese historical tale describing events understood to have occurred between 1368 and 1376.

His diary, Kuchi-ura, "gives considerable detail" of the Northern Court.

Notes

References
 Miner, Earl Roy. (1980). Japanese Linked Poetry: an Account with Translations of Renga and Haikai Sequences. Princeton: Princeton University Press. ; 
 
 Nussbaum, Louis Frédéric and Käthe Roth. (2005). Japan Encyclopedia. Cambridge: Harvard University Press. ; OCLC 48943301
 Titsingh, Isaac, ed. (1834). [Siyun-sai Rin-siyo/Hayashi Gahō, 1652], Nipon o daï itsi ran; ou,  Annales des empereurs du Japon. Paris: Oriental Translation Fund of Great Britain and Ireland.  OCLC  84067437
 

1320 births
1388 deaths
Fujiwara clan
Yoshimoto
People of Kamakura-period Japan
People of Nanboku-chō-period Japan
14th-century Japanese historians